is a 2013 Japanese horror film directed by Hideo Nakata. The film premiered at the Rotterdam Film Festival on January 1, 2013, and was released in Japan on May 18 that same year. A 12 episode drama, titled Kuroyuri Danchi ~Josho~ follows events leading up to those that take place in the film. It began airing in Japan on April 9, 2013. In May 2018, the series was released in the United States on Toku.

Plot
A young nursing student, Asuka Ninomiya (Atsuko Maeda) moves to a dilapidated apartment complex with her father, Isao; mother, Sachiko (Naomi Nishida); and younger brother, Satoshi. She tries to greet her elderly next door neighbor, Shinozaki, but with little success, and befriends a local boy named Minoru Kinoshita, whose only guardian is Shinozaki.

Asuka begins to experience strange things, including scratching noises and the sound of a loud alarm clock, both of which come from Shinozaki's flat. She is also wary of her own family, who seem to be doing the same activity and repeating the same conversation every day. Asuka later discovers that Shinozaki had died while scratching the wall, explaining the noises she heard every night. A detective tells her that he had been dead for three days without anyone finding him. Since then, Asuka feels that Shinozaki haunts her in anger for not finding him earlier.

When a cleanup team arrives to clean Shinozaki's flat, Asuka becomes acquainted with Shinobu Sasahara (Hiroki Narimiya), a cleaner with experiences in the supernatural who tells her that the living and the dead reside in two separate times: the living move forward in time, while the dead stop at the time they died. Asuka consults with Sasahara about Shinozaki's haunting and is told that he can contact a psychic friend of his. Returning home, Asuka is greeted by a completely empty home and no family and becomes hysterical. Sasahara learns from Asuka's foster parents that Asuka's entire family had died from a bus accident years ago with Asuka as the only survivor; since then, Asuka has been blaming herself, refusing to move on. Sasahara invites his psychic friend, Sanae Nonomura, who concludes that Asuka is not haunted by Shinozaki - he only wanted to say thank you for discovering him and warn her that she is in danger. She is actually being haunted by Minoru, a boy from the apartment complex who died 13 years ago when he hid inside a trash bin during a hide-and-seek game and was incinerated.

Asuka becomes withdrawn and depressed, refusing to move out even when Sasahara begs her to. She continues to play with Minoru, seeing him as a replacement for her dead little brother. Sasahara and Nonomura force her to allow the latter conduct an exorcism to expel Minoru's spirit from inhabiting Asuka's damaged mind. Sasahara forces Asuka not to let Minoru enter the flat even when Minoru projects her family's last memories, but he himself is lured into Minoru's trap when Minoru projects his vegetative girlfriend, Hitomi Makimura (Megumi Sato), who is in a coma. He lets Minoru in, killing Nonomura in the process. Asuka agrees to become Minoru's playmate in exchange for Sasahara's life, but Sasahara pushes her away, and gets himself thrown into a memory of Minoru's trash bin, where he is burned alive.

Asuka, found scratching and screaming at her apartment floor, is taken back by her foster parents. Despite their insistence, she continues to babble about her dead parents and brother while clutching her brother's doll.

Cast
 Atsuko Maeda as Asuka Ninomiya
 Yumena Kano as Young Asuka
 Hiroki Narimiya as Shinobu Sasahara
 Masanobu Katsumura as Isao Ninomiya
 Naomi Nishida as Sachiko Ninomiya
 Ruiki Sato as Satoshi Ninomiya
 Shiro Namiki as Takehiko Ninomiya
 Mariko Tsutsui as Eiko Ninomiya
 Megumi Sato as Hitomi Makimura
 Satomi Tezuka as Sanae Nonomura
 Yurei Yanagi as Ishizuka
 Masaya Takahashi as Shinozaki
 Kanau Tanaka as Minoru Kinoshita
 Taro Suwa as Detective

Release
The Complex premiered at the Rotterdam Film Festival on January 27, 2013. It had its theatrical release in Japan on May 18, 2013. The Complex debuted in first place at the Japanese Box Office grossing $1,486,523. It remained at the top of the Japanese Box Office for two weeks. The film has grossed a total of $8,738,992.

Reception

Critical reception for the movie was mixed. Screen Daily gave a positive review for The Complex, saying that it was an "impressively structured horror film that is likely to thrill audiences". The Hollywood Reporter panned the film as a "disappointingly cliche-bound return to J-Horror inspires more giggles than shivers."

References

External links

Japanese horror films
2013 horror films
Films directed by Hideo Nakata
Shochiku films
2013 films
Japanese haunted house films
Fiction about curses
Films scored by Kenji Kawai
Films set in apartment buildings
Japanese supernatural horror films
2010s Japanese films
2010s Japanese-language films